Chen Hao (born 21 February 1990 in China) is a Chinese baseball outfielder for the Jiangsu Hopestars. He was a member of the China national baseball team competing in the 2009 World Baseball Classic.

References

1990 births
Living people
Chinese baseball players
2009 World Baseball Classic players
Sportspeople from Wuxi
Baseball players from Jiangsu
Baseball players at the 2014 Asian Games
Asian Games competitors for China